The rufous-throated solitaire (Myadestes genibarbis) is a species of bird placed in the family Turdidae.

Distribution and habitat
It is found on Dominica, Hispaniola (in the Dominican Republic and Haiti), Jamaica, Martinique, Saint Lucia, Saint Vincent, and Puerto Rico. Its natural habitats are subtropical or tropical moist lowland forests and subtropical or tropical moist montane forests.

Names
The bird is nicknamed the siffleur montagne (or mountain whistler) in Dominica; a local folk group of the early 1970s, the Siffleur Montagne Chorale, named themselves after it. In the Dominican Republic and Puerto Rico, it is called solitario gorjirrufo.

Taxonomy
The subspecies M. g. sibilans is sometimes considered a full species, as the Saint Vincent solitaire (Myadestes sibilans).

References

rufous-throated solitaire
Endemic birds of the Caribbean
Birds of Jamaica
Birds of Hispaniola
Birds of the Dominican Republic
Birds of Haiti
Birds of the Lesser Antilles
rufous-throated solitaire
Taxonomy articles created by Polbot